Newberg may refer to:

Places in the United States
 Newberg, California, former name of Newburg, California
 Newberg, Oregon
 Newberg, Wisconsin
 Newberg Corners, Wisconsin, an unincorporated community
 Newberg Township, Michigan

Other uses
 Lobster Newberg
 Newberg (surname)
 Newberg School District, Oregon
 Newberg High School, Oregon

See also 
 Newborough (disambiguation)
 Newburg (disambiguation)
 Newburgh (disambiguation)